Gustav Max Wiederkehr (2 October 1905 – 7 July 1972) was a Swiss football administrator. He served as UEFA President from 1962 to 1972.

References 

1905 births
People from Zürich
Presidents of UEFA
Association football executives
1972 deaths